Martín Kutscher (born December 9, 1984 in Salto, Uruguay) is a national-record holding freestyle swimmer from Uruguay who swam for Uruguay at 2004 and 2008 Olympics. His brother Paul is also an Olympic swimmer, having swum for Uruguay at the 2000 and 2004 Olympics.

International Tournaments
2004 Olympics
2007 World Championships
2007 Pan American Games
South American Swimming Championships 2008
2008 Olympics
2009 World Championships

External links

1977 births
Living people
Olympic swimmers of Uruguay
Uruguayan male freestyle swimmers
Swimmers at the 2004 Summer Olympics
Swimmers at the 2008 Summer Olympics
Swimmers at the 2007 Pan American Games
Swimmers at the 2011 Pan American Games
Pan American Games competitors for Uruguay
Uruguayan people of German descent
South American Games gold medalists for Uruguay
South American Games medalists in swimming
Competitors at the 2006 South American Games
Sportspeople from Salto, Uruguay
20th-century Uruguayan people
21st-century Uruguayan people